The women's 400 metre freestyle competition of the swimming events at the 2011 World Aquatics Championships took place July 24. The heats and the final took place on July 24.

Records
Prior to the competition, the existing world and championship records were as follows.

Results

Heats

38 swimmers participated in 5 heats, qualified swimmers are listed:

Final
The final was held at 18:50.

References

External links
2011 World Aquatics Championships: Women's 400 metre freestyle entry list, from OmegaTiming.com; retrieved 2011-07-23.

Freestyle 0400 metre, women's
World Aquatics Championships
2011 in women's swimming